Sare may refer to:

People
 Bakary Saré (born 1990), Burkinabé football player
 Clyde W. Sare (1936–2015), American politician and businessman
 Haig Sare (born 1982), Australian rugby union player
 Hamit Şare (born 1982), Turkish alpine skier
 Karl Säre (1903–1945), Estonian communist politician
 N'Diklam Sare (ruled c.1390–c.1420), Jolof ruler
 Resul Sare (born 1970), Turkish alpine skier
 Sare N'Dyaye (ruled c.1370–c.1390), Jolof ruler

Places
 Säre, Estonia
 Šare, Serbia
 Sare, Pyrénées-Atlantiques, France

Other
 Sare language, also known as Kapriman language
 SARE, Sustainable Agriculture Research and Education
 SARE, the ICAO code for Resistencia International Airport, Argentina